Gushchinsky is a rural locality (a khutor) in Samolshinskoye Rural Settlement, Alexeyevsky District, Volgograd Oblast, Russia. The population was 184 as of 2010.

Geography 
Gushchinsky is located 16 km northwest of Alexeyevskaya (the district's administrative centre) by road. Tishanskaya is the nearest rural locality.

References 

Rural localities in Alexeyevsky District, Volgograd Oblast